"Witch Hunt" is a song by Canadian rock band Rush. It was released on their 1981 album Moving Pictures, and unlike many other Rush songs it was a true studio production, with a variety of percussion instruments and overdubs, and a separate keyboard player. It is the first of four songs in what has been called the band's "Fear" series, the other three being "The Weapon" (from Signals, 1982), "The Enemy Within" (from Grace Under Pressure, 1984), and "Freeze" (from Vapor Trails, 2002), although this song is the third part of the series in order, and went on reverse chronological order by the album (except the "Freeze" is the exact fourth part like normal chronological order).

Content, lyrics, and production
The song opens with the sounds of a mob, which Lifeson explained was recorded outside Le Studio on a cold December day, with the band and others shouting, warmed by a bottle of Scotch whisky; they recorded a dozen tracks of this. The lyrics describe how a vigilante mob gathers under torch light, distorting the features of the "twisted and grotesque" faces: "The righteous rise / With burning eyes / Of hatred and ill-will / Madmen fed on fear and lies / To beat and burn and kill". The lyrics do not explain what the mob intends to do, but in the second set of stanzas indicate that the mob feeds on xenophobia and religious zealotry: "They say there are strangers who threaten us / Our immigrants and infidels / They say there is strangeness too dangerous / In our theaters and bookstore shelves".

Neil Peart explained later that the song was done as "a studio production number", as opposed to most other songs, which were done as a three-piece band. It features a broad array of percussive instruments: "gong bass drums, wind chimes, glockenspiel, tubular bells, conga, cowbell, vibraslap, various electronic effects", according to Peart. Cover designer Hugh Syme contributed synthesizer and in one verse the drums are double-tracked. Music critic Martin Popoff described it as "the most reworked and fretted-over song of the album".

Critical evaluations
The "foreboding" song's lyrics are written by Neil Peart, and they "criticize intolerance", according to Steven Horwitz, who places the song in the context of the Moral Majority of the late 1970s and early 1980s, when "those who know what's best for us" were invited to "rise and save us from ourselves". Max Mobley, writing in 2014, recognized themes from Kurt Vonnegut in the song and remarked that the "song seems incredibly relevant today", "given how intolerant and angry we are today".

Live performance
The song was not played live until three years later, on the tour for Grace Under Pressure. At the end of the 1980s it was dropped from the regular live setlist but returned for the Snakes & Arrows Tour, which started in 2007, where it was a good fit, according to Max Mobley, "in mood and message". By the time of the Grace Under Pressure tour, the song had acquired an additional lengthy guitar solo at the end, as can be seen on the tour video. For Andrew Cole, a musician and English professor at Princeton, this is an instance of Lifeson "translating" (a term Cole uses in the way in which Walter Benjamin used it) the original—the guitar "embellishing, nay, translating Geddy's flangey breakout bass part from the studio cut". The 1989 version on A Show of Hands has a "more elaborate" solo: "Rush practices Benjaminian translation in homage to its own originals, plausibly knowing that interest can lie as much in variation as in fidelity".

See also

List of Rush songs

References

1981 songs
Rush (band) songs
Songs written by Alex Lifeson
Songs written by Geddy Lee
Songs written by Neil Peart
Song recordings produced by Terry Brown (record producer)
Songs about Canada